This is a summary of the electoral history of Gordon Coates, Prime Minister of New Zealand (1925–28), Leader of the Reform Party (1925–36), Member of Parliament for Kaipara (1911–43).

Parliamentary elections

1911 election

1914 election

1919 election

1922 election

1925 election

1928 election

1931 election

1935 election

1938 election

Notes

References

Coates, Joseph Gordon